Lean is a theorem prover and programming language. It is based on the calculus of constructions with inductive types.

The Lean project is an open-source project hosted on GitHub.  It was launched by Leonardo de Moura at Microsoft Research in 2013.

Lean has an interface, implemented as a Visual Studio Code extension and Language Server Protocol server, that differentiates it from other interactive theorem provers. It has native support for Unicode symbols, which can be typed using LaTeX-like sequences, such as "\times" for "×". Lean can also be compiled to JavaScript and accessed in a web browser and has extensive support for meta-programming.

Started in 2017, the user-maintained library mathlib contains the largest collection of mathematics that has been formalized in Lean. As of February 2023, mathlib contains over 100,000 theorems and 1,000,000 lines of code.

Lean has gotten attention from mathematicians Thomas Hales and Kevin Buzzard. Hales is using it for his project, Formal Abstracts. Buzzard uses it for the Xena project. One of the Xena Project's goals is to rewrite every theorem and proof in the undergraduate math curriculum of Imperial College London in Lean.

Examples (Lean 3)

The natural numbers can be defined as an inductive type. This definition is based on the Peano axioms and states that every natural number is either zero or the successor of some other natural number.
inductive nat : Type
| zero : nat
| succ : nat → nat

Addition of natural numbers can be defined recursively, using pattern matching.
definition add : nat → nat → nat
| n zero     := n
| n (succ m) := succ (add n m)

This is a simple proof in lean in term mode.
theorem and_swap : p ∧ q → q ∧ p :=
    assume h1 : p ∧ q,
    ⟨h1.right, h1.left⟩

This same proof can be accomplished using tactics.
theorem and_swap (p q : Prop) : p ∧ q → q ∧ p :=
begin
    assume h : (p ∧ q), -- assume p ∧ q is true
    cases h, -- extract the individual propositions from the conjunction
    split, -- split the goal conjunction into two cases: prove p and prove q separately
    repeat { assumption }
end

See also

 Dependent type
 List of proof assistants
 mimalloc
 Type theory

References

External links
 Lean Website
 Lean Community Website
 The Natural Number Game- An interactive tutorial to learn lean

Programming languages created in 2013
Proof assistants
Dependently typed languages
Educational math software
Functional languages
Free and open-source software
Free software programmed in C++
Microsoft free software
Microsoft programming languages
Microsoft Research
Software using the Apache license